Pseudometachilo subfaunellus is a moth in the family Crambidae. It was described by Stanisław Błeszyński in 1967. It is found in Uruguay.

References

Moths described in 1967